Bad Living is a 2023 Portuguese-French drama film directed by João Canijo. Starring Anabela Moreira and Rita Blanco, the film portrays story of a family of several women from different generations, whose relationships with each other have grown poisoned by bitterness. It was selected to compete for the Golden Bear at the 73rd Berlin International Film Festival, where it had its world premiere on 22 February 2023. It won Silver Bear Jury Prize at the festival.

At the same time, the director has made another film, Living Bad, in which the main focus is on guests coming to hotel. In his statement the director said that for the screenplay about the hotel guests, he was inspired by motifs from plays by August Strindberg. Living Bad was selected at the 73rd Berlin International Film Festival in Encounter.

Synopsis
A group of women from different generations of the same family is running a hotel by the Portuguese northern shore. Their relationships with each other have gone sour and they are trying to survive in the declining hotel. Then an unexpected arrival of a granddaughter stirs trouble, as the latent hatred and piled-up resentments comes to fore.

Cast
 Anabela Moreira as Piedade
 Rita Blanco as Sara
 Madalena Almeida as Salome
 Cleia Almeida as Raquel
 Vera Barreto as Angela
 Nuno Lopes as Jaime
 Filipa Areosa as Camila
 Leonor Silveira as Elisa
 Rafael Morais as Alex
 Lia Carvalho as Graça
 Beatriz Batarda as Judite
 Carolina Amaral as Alice
 Leonor Vasconselos as Julia

Production
The film was shot over a 12-week period in early 2021 at the Hotel Parque do Rio in Praia de Ofir. At the same time, Living Bad , a second film was made, that focuses on the guests of the hotel. According to a producer of the film, the sound and content are said to be "two completely different films". "One becomes more interesting when you see the other," explained the producer Pedro Borges.

Release
The film had its World premiere at the 73rd Berlin International Film Festival on 22 February 2023. It is slated for theatrical release in Portugal on 11 May 2023.

Reception

On the review aggregator Rotten Tomatoes website, the film has an approval rating of 60% based on 5 reviews, with an average rating of 8/10.

Nicholas Bell in IonCinema.com graded the film 4/5 and wrote, "But this is inherently the essence of Bad Living, concerning a handful of humans making decisions which actively poison them slowly, until someone invariably can’t take it any more." Leslie Felperin of The Hollywood Reporter calling the film "Bad to the bone" wrote, "Punishingly slow, grandiloquently depressing and ultimately not even especially convincing psychologically, Bad Living feels like the work of people who sincerely believed they were making great art." Felperin added, "Sadly, they were mistaken." Lee Marshall for ScreenDaily wrote in review, "A haunting work with a ritualistic feel, as if its five central characters have been possessed by the souls of some ancient Greek theatre troupe."

Accolades

References

External links
 
 
 Bad Living at Berlinale
 

2023 films
Films directed by João Canijo
2023 drama films
Portuguese drama films
French drama films
Films shot in Portugal
2020s Portuguese-language films